The Cuerpo Guardia de Infantería (Infantry Guard Corps, CGI) is the official denomination of all police riot control services of Argentina. Both federal and provincial law enforcement agencies have at least one.

The CGI are small, quick response teams, trained mainly in crowd control tactics and equipped with non-lethal shotguns, gas masks, police batons, plastic shields and other specialized riot gear.

See also
Scorpion Group
Albatross Group
Hawk Special Operations Brigade
Federal Special Operations Group
Argentine Federal Police

Law enforcement in Argentina